"Dirty Work" is a song written by Donald Fagen and Walter Becker of Steely Dan, which appeared on the band's 1972 debut album Can't Buy a Thrill.

Theme 
The song's lyrics describe an affair between a man and a married woman, sung by the man.  Steely Dan FAQ author Anthony Robustelli describes "Dirty Work" as a "song of self-loathing", while The Guardian describes the narrative as soap operatic.  The singer recognizes that the woman is using him, but is too infatuated to end the affair.  The second verse features the lyrics: "Like a castle in its corner in a medieval game",  referencing the chess-piece the rook, chess being a hobby of Becker's.

Style and arrangement 
The song's music has been described as more commercial-sounding than most of the band's other material.  The Guardian says that it sounds like "a radio-friendly stroll of a song," at least at first.  AllMusic critic Stewart Mason attributes this, in part, to the "upward-modulating" refrain and "soulful" clavinet  as well as the tenor saxophone part played by guest musician Jerome Richardson.  Steely Dan biographer Brian Sweet describes Richardson's sax solo as being "perfectly understated."

"Dirty Work" is one of the songs on Can't Buy a Thrill on which David Palmer provided the lead vocal.  Brian Sweet hypothesizes that Fagen did not want to sing the song himself because he and Becker did not even want to include it on the album, but the executives at ABC Records wanted some more conventional tunes on the album and therefore insisted that "Dirty Work" be included. The ABC executives had also thought the song would be ideal for Three Dog Night or The Grass Roots to record. After Palmer left the group, touring vocalist Royce Jones would sing the song live in concert. It was revived in 2006, however, with the band's female backing vocalists singing it from the perspective of a woman having an affair with a married (or attached) man.

Release and reception
The song was included on the band's 1972 debut album Can't Buy a Thrill. The same year it was released as single, on the Probe label, in the Netherlands.

AllMusic critic Stephen Thomas Erlewine describes "Dirty Work" as a "terrific pop song that subvert[s] traditional conventions" and is one of the best songs on Can't Buy a Thrill,  while MusicHound author Gary Graff refers to it as being "instantly memorable."  Rolling Stone critic James Isaacs attributes the song's success to the fact that it "juxtaposes David Palmer's sweet tenor voice with misogynistic lyrics."  Robustelli similarly agrees that part of the song's effect is the contrast between Palmer's smooth voice and the harsh lyrics. "Dirty Work" was included on several Steely Dan compilation albums, including Citizen Steely Dan in 1993, Showbiz Kids: The Steely Dan Story, 1972–1980 in 2000 and Steely Dan: The Definitive Collection in 2006.

Later use 
The song was used in the first episode of season 3 of The Sopranos, "Mr. Ruggerio's Neighborhood," as Tony Soprano sings it while driving his SUV unaware that the FBI are watching him. The song was also used in the 2013 film American Hustle, although Fagen and Becker did not give permission for it to be included on the soundtrack album. In the eighth episode of season 28 of The Simpsons, "Dad Behavior," Homer Simpson sings a parody of the song’s chorus. The song was later used in the fourteenth episode of season 33, "You Won't Believe What This Episode Is About – Act Three Will Shock You!". It's also featured in the 2018 documentary Robin Williams: Come Inside My Mind. It also appeared in the trailers and television advertisements for the 2021 film The Suicide Squad. The song was used in the first episode of the second season of hit HBO drama Euphoria.

Personnel 
(from album cover credits)
David Palmer – lead vocals
Donald Fagen – piano, Wurlitzer electric piano, Yamaha YC-30 organ, and backup vocals
Denny Dias – acoustic guitar
Jeff Baxter – electric guitar
Walter Becker – bass guitar, backup vocals
Jim Hodder – drums, backup vocals
Jerome Richardson – tenor saxophone
Snooky Young – flugelhorn

Other recordings 
Iain Matthews recorded the song, appearing on his 1974 album, Some Days You Eat the Bear And Some Days the Bear Eats You. The Vancouver-based studio group Songbird  (Mike Flicker, Howard Leese and Rob Deans) had a Mushroom Records single release of "Dirty Work" which was a minor hit in Canada, peaking at #75 on the national hit parade in the autumn of 1974. The song is the first track of the 1974 album I'm Not Making Music for Money, the thirteenth and final studio album by Kenny Rogers and The First Edition that was only issued in New Zealand. Melissa Manchester recorded "Dirty Work" on her 1977 LP Help Is on the Way. The Pointer Sisters recorded a version for their 1978 album Energy. "Dirty  Work" was recorded by Max Merritt and released as a single, on the Polydor label, in Australia and New Zealand, in 1979.

References

Notes

Steely Dan songs
Songs written by Donald Fagen
Songs written by Walter Becker
Song recordings produced by Gary Katz
1972 songs
José Feliciano songs
Melissa Manchester songs
Iain Matthews songs
The Pointer Sisters songs
Mushroom Records singles
Songs about infidelity